Shannon, formerly called GO Navigator, is an offshore supply ship owned and operated by Guice Offshore, and currently deployed as one of the SpaceX Dragon/Dragon 2 recovery vessels along with Megan. Both the vessels are identical and equipped with a medical treatment facility, helipad, lifting frame, etc.

The vessel played a key role in the recovery operation of SpaceX's first crewed mission - Crew Dragon Demo-2.

History 
GO Navigator'''s services were procured by SpaceX as a quick transport vessel, as a back-up to GO Searcher in the event of any technical failures.

In 2018 and 2019, the vessel and its crew were deployed for several hours of training to prepare for the recovery of the Dragon 2 capsules and their astronauts. The vessel executed the recovery operations during the Crew Dragon In-Flight Abort Test.

Between April and May 2019, GO Navigator was temporarily re-assigned to fairing recovery operations for the ArabSat-6A, Starlink 0.9, STP-2, and Amos-17 missions.GO stands for Guice Offshore, the owner and operator of these type of vessels.

In early 2022, the vessel was renamed Shannon after SpaceX Crew-1 astronaut Shannon Walker, along with GO Searcher being renamed Megan after SpaceX Crew-2 astronaut Megan McArthur. They are registered to Falcon Landing LLC, a SpaceX-linked company that also owns recovery ships Bob and Doug and Elon's private jet.

List of recovery missions

Mission Overview
Demo-2
For the Crew Dragon Demo-2 mission, the GO Navigator had a broken backup generator; however it still completed its mission and recovered the Endeavour capsule from the sea. The recovery was impeded by private boats which circled the capsule in the water.

See also
 [[Megan (SpaceX Dragon Recovery Ship)|Megan]], another SpaceX Dragon recovery ship

References

External links

Ships built in the United States
Ships built in Alabama
SpaceX Dragon 2
Space capsule recovery ships